Swisher is the second studio album by electronic duo Blondes. It was released in August 2013 on RVNG Intl.

In terms of year-end lists of best albums, Swisher was the 20th best according to XLR8R, ranked number 35 on Obscure Sounds list, was number 40 on the ranking by Rough Trade Records, 48 on Urban Outfitters' list, and 59 on Crack Magazines.

Track listing

References

2013 albums